Howard Alexander McFarland (March 7, 1910 – April 7, 1993) was an American baseball player in both professional and semi-pro leagues who appeared in six games for the Washington Senators of Major League Baseball in —the last year of MLB's World War II manpower shortage—after a seven-year hiatus from the professional ranks.

McFarland had played in the minor leagues from 1932 to 1937, spending the latter season with the Class A1 Chattanooga Lookouts, a Senators' farm system affiliate. He then left pro ball for nearly eight full seasons. In July 1945, the Senators, battling the Detroit Tigers for the American League pennant and "desperate for players," signed McFarland to a big-league contract. He was used by Washington manager Ossie Bluege in six games, with one start in right field against the Boston Red Sox on August 4. Six days later, he collected his only MLB hit, an RBI single off Thornton Lee of the Chicago White Sox at Comiskey Park. His last appearance for Washington came on August 16, when he flied out as a pinch hitter against the Tigers' Hall of Fame left-hander, Hal Newhouser.

In his six games in the majors, McFarland had 11 plate appearances, with one hit, no runs scored, no bases on balls, and two career runs batted in.  He batted .091. He didn't play pro ball in 1946, but returned to the minor leagues in 1947 for one last season, batting .362 for Odessa in the Class D Longhorn League.

Howard McFarland died in Wichita, Kansas, aged 83, in 1993.

References

External links

1910 births
1993 deaths
Albany Senators players
Baseball players from Oklahoma
Buffalo Bisons (minor league) players
Chattanooga Lookouts players
Joplin Miners players
Lincoln Links players
Major League Baseball outfielders
Minor league baseball managers
Odessa Oilers players
People from El Reno, Oklahoma
St. Joseph Saints players
Washington Senators (1901–1960) players
Williamsport Grays players